The People's Party was a political party in the United States, founded in 1971 by various individuals and state and local political parties, including the Peace and Freedom Party, Commongood People's Party, Country People's Caucus, Human Rights Party, Liberty Union, New American Party, New Party (Arizona), and No Party.  The party's goal was to present a united anti-war platform for the coming election.

The People's Party fielded candidates for the presidency two times. First in U.S. presidential election, 1972 with Dr. Benjamin Spock (an American pediatrician and author of parenting books) as their candidate.  The party also contested the U.S. presidential election, 1976.  The presidential candidate this time was Margaret Wright. Dr. Spock was the Party's candidate for vice president.

After the election, the party moved to become a loose coalition, but was soon defunct, with most of its founding parties also dissolved.

The party's papers are now in the Western Historical Manuscript Collection of the University of Missouri–St. Louis, St. Louis, Missouri, having been where the party had held its conventions.

1972 election
The People's Party ran Dr. Benjamin Spock for president and Julius Hobson for vice president in the 1972 U.S. presidential election.  The party platform included free medical care, legalized abortion, legalized marijuana, a guaranteed minimum wage, the withdrawal of American troops from all foreign countries, a guaranteed maximum wage, and promoting toleration of homosexuality. Dr. Spock and the People's Party received 78,759 votes (0.10%).

In 1976, Spock was the party's vice presidential candidate.

Greer v. Spock 
In 1972, Spock, Hobson, Linda Jenness (Socialist Workers Party presidential candidate), and Socialist Workers Party vice presidential candidate Andrew Pulley wrote to Major General Bert A. David, commanding officer of Fort Dix, asking for permission to distribute campaign literature and to hold an election-related campaign meeting. On the basis of Fort Dix regulations 210-26 and 210-27, General David refused the request. Spock, Hobson, Jenness, Pulley, and others then filed a case that ultimately made its way to the United States Supreme Court (424 U.S. 828—Greer, Commander, Fort Dix Military Reservation, et al., v. Spock et al.), which ruled against the plaintiffs.  Greer v. Spock was, according to Professor Joshua E. Kastenberg, part of the Burger Court's jurisprudence of insulating the military from non-mainstream political influences.  As Spock and his contemporaries had been outspoken against the United States involvement in the Vietnam War, there was a fear that he would influence soldiers to refuse to comply with orders to deploy into combat.

1976 election
In 1976 the People's Party ran Margaret Wright as president and Spock this time as vice president after Maggie Kuhn declined the spot. The People's Party received 49,016 votes (0.06%).

Presidential tickets

References

Political parties established in 1971
Defunct political parties in the United States
Defunct democratic socialist parties in the United States
Defunct social democratic parties in the United States
1971 establishments in the United States